The 1974–75 Liga Leumit season saw Hapoel Be'er Sheva win their first ever title. Moshe Romano of Beitar Tel Aviv was the league's top scorer with 17 goals.

Although two clubs were due to be relegated, they were eventually reprieved after the Israel Football Association decided to expand the league to 18 clubs for the following season.

Final table

Results

References
Israel - List of final tables RSSSF

Liga Leumit seasons
Israel
1974–75 in Israeli football leagues